NGC 4620 is a lenticular galaxy located about 65 million light-years away in the constellation of Virgo. It was discovered by astronomer John Herschel on March 29, 1830. NGC 4620 is a member of the Virgo Cluster.

See also 
 List of NGC objects (4001–5000)
 NGC 4733

References

External links
 

Lenticular galaxies
Virgo (constellation)
4620
42619
7859
Astronomical objects discovered in 1830
Virgo Cluster